The following article comprises the results of the Hockeyroos, the women's national field hockey team from Australia, from 2001 until 2005. New fixtures can be found on the International Hockey Federation's results portal.

Match results

2001 results

Argentina test series

III East Asian Games

III Korea Telecom Cup

II Oceania Cup

Netherlands test match

IX FIH Champions Trophy

New Zealand test series

2002 results

Six Nations (Gifu)

Hockey Australia International Challenge

Netherlands test series

XVII Commonwealth Games

X FIH Champions Trophy

X FIH World Cup

2003 results

III Oceania Cup

IV Korea Telecom Cup

Europe test matches

I RaboTrophy

XI FIH Champions Trophy

2004 results

Athens International Hockey Tournament

South Africa test series

China test series

India test series

Three Nations (Darwin)

Three Nations (Townsville)

Four Nations (Alcalá la Real)

XXVIII Summer Olympic Games

XII FIH Champions Trophy

2005 results

United States test series

Canada test series

Korea test series

XII Indira Gandhi Cup

IV Oceania Cup

Argentina test series

XIII FIH Champions Trophy

References

Australia women's national field hockey team